Seagrave is a village and civil parish in the Charnwood district of Leicestershire, England.

Seagrave may also refer to:

Places
Barton Seagrave, village and civil parish in the Kettering borough of Northamptonshire, England
Seagrave, Ontario, a Canadian community in Scugog township

People
Dan Seagrave (born 1971), British artist
Gordon Seagrave (1897 – 1965), Burmese missionary and author
Jocelyn Seagrave (born 1968), American film and television actress
Mabel Seagrave (1882–1935), American physician 
Sterling Seagrave (1937–2017), American historian 

Other
Seagrave Fire Apparatus, American manufacturer of fire apparatus

See also
Segrave (disambiguation)
Seagraves (disambiguation)
Segraves (disambiguation)